Power Company is a song written and performed by Eric Burdon. It was released in 1980.

Background
The first version of the tune was recorded with "Eric Burdon's Fire Dept." in April 1980 in France. It was released as a single and peaked No. 11 in Austria. In 1981, Burdon recorded a different rendition, released on the 1983 album Power Company.

In 1992 another version, recorded 1981, was released on The Unreleased Eric Burdon.

References

Eric Burdon songs
1980 singles
1980 songs
Songs written by Eric Burdon